Omoto may refer to:

Oomoto, a Japanese religion
Omoto, the Japanese name for the ornamental plant Rohdea japonica
Omoto, New Zealand, a small settlement inland from Greymouth in the South Island
Omoto locomotive dump at Omoto, New Zealand